The Olympic torrent salamander (Rhyacotriton olympicus) is a species of salamander in the family Rhyacotritonidae. This is a small salamander (up to 10 cm total length) that lives in clear, cold, mountain streams. It is medium to dark brown and may have a few small light spots on the sides and small dark spots on the tail; it is bright yellow on the belly, usually with some dark spots. Torrent salamanders typically have short snouts and relatively large eyes. As in other torrent salamanders, adult males have square-edged lobes behind the cloaca. These salamanders live at the edges of clear, cold, mountain streams; they can be abundant under gravel at stream edges and in the spray zones of waterfalls. During rainy seasons, they are occasionally found under objects on land away from streams.

Its natural habitats are temperate forests, rivers, and freshwater springs.
It is threatened by habitat loss.

References

Rhyacotriton
Amphibians of the United States
Endemic fauna of Washington (state)
Amphibians described in 1917
Taxa named by Helen Beulah Thompson Gaige
Taxonomy articles created by Polbot